The Algerian sand gecko (Tropiocolotes algericus) is a species of gecko of the genus Tropiocolotes. It is found in all the Maghreb countries with the exception of Libya.

References

algericus
Reptiles described in 1947
Reptiles of North Africa